Rolf Saxon is an American actor. He is well known for his voice over work in video games, movies and TV shows.

Life and career
Saxon was born at Fort Belvoir in Alexandria, Virginia. He has worked with American Conservatory Theater, Cal Shakes, the Berkeley Mime Troupe, and Omphalos Street Theatre Company.

Awards and nominations
Upon his graduation at the Guildhall School of Music and Drama, Saxon was awarded the Gold Medal. While performing with the Omphalos Street Theatre Company at the Edinburgh Festival, he was nominated for the Fringe First Award. Critics praised Saxon's performance as Victor Franz in The Price play, earning him the Best Actor in A Leading Role Award at the Manchester Evening News Theatre Awards. Films such as Saving Private Ryan and Tomorrow Never Dies, the TV series Agatha Christie's Poirot, and video games the Broken Sword series and The Witcher received several awards and nominations.

Filmography
Television

Film

Stage/Theatre

Video
 Coronation Street Viva Las Vegas (1997) - Stephano Delaney
 Teletubbies: Merry Christmas, Teletubbies! (1999) - Narrator (voice)
 Teletubbies: Christmas in the Snow (2000) - Narrator (voice)
 Teletubbies: Silly Songs and Funny Dances (2002) - Narrator (voice)

Video games

References

External links
 
 Rolf Saxon at Film Reference

Living people
Alumni of the Guildhall School of Music and Drama
American male film actors
American male stage actors
American male television actors
American male video game actors
American male voice actors
Male actors from Alexandria, Virginia
Male actors from the San Francisco Bay Area
People from Fort Belvoir, Virginia
Year of birth missing (living people)
21st-century American male actors
20th-century American male actors